Blue Ridge Depot is a historic train depot in Blue Ridge, Georgia. It was added to the National Register of Historic Places on July 15, 1982. It is located on Depot Street. The current building was constructed in 1906. The depot is the starting point of the Blue Ridge Scenic Railway.

See also
National Register of Historic Places listings in Fannin County, Georgia

References

Railway stations on the National Register of Historic Places in Georgia (U.S. state)
Transportation in Fannin County, Georgia
National Register of Historic Places in Fannin County, Georgia
Former Louisville and Nashville Railroad stations
Railway stations in the United States opened in 1906
Former railway stations in Georgia (U.S. state)